Passenger is the second album by Canadian singer-songwriter Tara MacLean, released in 2000.

Track listing
"Jericho" – 3:34Tara MacLean
"Divided" – 4:40Tara MacLean, Bill Bell
"If I Fall" – 4:09Tara MacLean
"Reach" – 4:54Tara MacLean, Bill Bell
"Dry Land" – 3:30Tara MacLean
"Jordan" – 5:20Tara MacLean
"Passenger" – 4:00Tara MacLean, Bill Bell
"Settling" – 4:05Tara MacLean
"Poor Boy" – 3:53Tara MacLean, Bill Bell
"La Tempete" – 3:51Lennie Gallant
"Blinded" – 3:07Tara MacLean
"Higher" – 5:06Tara MacLean, Bill Bell
"Shakota" [Hidden Track] – 4:12Tara MacLean, Bill Bell

Personnel
Tara MacLean – vocals (1, 2, 3, 4, 5, 6, 7, 8, 9, 10, 11, 12, 13), piano (1, 2, 3), acoustic guitar (5, 6)
Bill Bell – guitar (1, 2, 3, 4, 5, 6, 7, 8, 9, 10, 12), Programming (1, 2, 3, 4, 7, 9, 13), backing vocals (6, 8, 13), mandolin (7), bass (8), wurlitzer (9)
Malcolm Burn – Djembe (6), backing vocals (6), Omnichord (10), bass guitar (3, 5, 7), drum thing (5), everything else (4), Rhodes (2)
Mark Jowett – guitar (4)
Robbie Buchanan – piano (8)
Alex Lifeson – guitar (3)
Allen Stepansky – cello (9)
Andrew McLean – Tablas (7)
Astrid Williamson – piano (10)
Carl Petzelt – B3 (7)
Carlo Nuccio – drums (1, 2, 3, 4, 6, 9, 10)
Conway Kuo – violin (3, 4, 11), viola (3, 4, 11)
David Rolfe – guitar (3)
Erik Friedlander – cello (9)
Everyone else at the party – vibe (13)
Jeff Treffinger – Omnichord (6)
Karl Berger – string arrangements (3, 4, 11)
Kathie Sinsabaugh – viola (3, 4, 11)
Michelle Kinney – cello (3, 4, 11)
Mike Skinkis – additional percussion (6) Percussion (7)
Pauline Kim – violin (3, 4, 11)
Peter Martin Weimer – violin (3, 4, 11)
Rene Coman – bass guitar (1, 2, 4, 6, 9, 10)
Robert Rinehart – viola (9)
Sandra Park – violin (9)
Sharon Yimada – violin (9)
Shaye Martirano – backing vocals (13)
Simon Collins – Djembe (13), shakers (13)
Stephen Barber – string arrangement (9)
Steve Gorn – Bansuri (12)
Veda Hille – piano (11)
Xavier Sharpenpier – Akai trumpet (1, 2, 3, 4, 5, 6, 7)

Production
Produced by Bill Bell (8, 13) Malcolm Burn (5, 6, 10, 11) Malcolm Burn, and Bill Bell (1, 2, 3, 4, 7, 9, 12)
Mixed by Jack Joseph Puig (1, 2, 3, 4, 6, 7) Brian Malouf (5, 8, 9, 10, 11, 12), and Bill Bell (13)
Jack Joseph Puig Mixed at Ocean Way Recordings, Los Angeles; assisted by Jim Champagne, Richard Ash, David Sessions, Dan Chase
Brian Malouf Mixed at Electric Lady Studios, New York; assisted by Mike Tocci
Bill Bell Mixed at Home (13)
Recorded by Malcolm Burn at Clouet St. Studio, New Orleans; engineered by Carl Petzelt; additional engineering by Zach Bulos
Recorded by Malcolm Burn at Dreamland Studio, Woodstock, New York; assisted by Suzanne Kappa (11, 12, strings on 3, 4)
Recorded by John Leventhal at Sear Sound, New York; engineered by Todd Schick; assisted by Todd Parker
Recorded by Bill Bell at Home (13) and produced at All Locations

References

2000 albums
Tara MacLean albums
Albums produced by Malcolm Burn
Capitol Records albums
Nettwerk Records albums